Ramon Zenhäusern (born 4 May 1992) is a Swiss World Cup alpine ski racer and specializes in slalom. He made his World Cup debut in November 2012 and competed at the 2014 Winter Olympics in Sochi, in slalom. At the Olympics in 2018, Zenhäusern took silver in the slalom and gold in the team event. He competed in the slalom at the 2022 Olympic Winter Games in Beijing. At his third World Championships in 2019, he was fifth in the slalom and won gold in the team event.

World Cup results

Season standings

Race podiums
 5 wins (3 SL, 2 PS)
 12 podiums (9 SL, 3 PS)

World Championship results

Olympic results

Universiade results

References

External links
 
 
 Ramon Zenhäusern at Swiss Ski Team 
  

1992 births
Living people
Alpine skiers at the 2014 Winter Olympics
Alpine skiers at the 2018 Winter Olympics
Alpine skiers at the 2022 Winter Olympics
Swiss male alpine skiers
Olympic alpine skiers of Switzerland
Universiade medalists in alpine skiing
Medalists at the 2018 Winter Olympics
Olympic medalists in alpine skiing
Olympic gold medalists for Switzerland
Olympic silver medalists for Switzerland
Universiade gold medalists for Switzerland
Competitors at the 2015 Winter Universiade
Sportspeople from Valais